"Dream on Me" is a song by British singer and songwriter Ella Henderson and Dominican-American house music DJ and producer Roger Sanchez. The song was released as a single on 2 October 2020 through Asylum Records. The song was written by Henderson, Jordan Riley, Roger Sanchez, Uzoechi Emenike, Wrabel and Steve Lukather.

Background
The song samples "Another Chance" by Roger Sanchez, which she described as one of her favorite songs. In an interview with the Daily Mirror, she said, "I wrote it and thought, 'I need to get this signed off by Roger'. He could have been so massively insulted we would even touch Another Chance! Thank God he was like, 'I love it!'. I loved that song. It was an era of them kind of records that have space for big vocalists. I remember the video of that person on the Tube with a massive heart!" She also said on her Instagram, "I wrote this song about missing people who I love and dreaming about being with them. It's been a ridiculous summer for all of us and I hope this song makes you dance and feel close to the people you love!"

Personnel
Credits adapted from Tidal.
 Jordan Riley – Producer, composer
 Gabriella Henderson – Composer
 Roger Sanchez – Composer 
 Uzoechi Osisioma Uzo Emenike – Composer 
 Wrabel – Composer
 Steve Lukather – Composer

Charts

References

2020 songs
2020 singles
Ella Henderson songs
Roger Sanchez songs
Songs written by Ella Henderson
Songs written by MNEK
Songs written by Wrabel
Songs written by Steve Lukather
Songs written by Jordan Riley
Asylum Records singles